Matthew Scott Holland (born June 7, 1966) has been a general authority of the Church of Jesus Christ of Latter-day Saints (LDS Church) since April 2020.  He previously served as the 6th president of Utah Valley University (UVU) in Orem, Utah, and its first president after UVU was granted university status (as opposed to a college).

Biography 
Holland earned the rank of Eagle Scout from the Boy Scouts of America in 1980.

Holland was selected as UVU's sixth president by the Utah State Board of Regents in the spring of 2009 and officially began his tenure on June 1 of that year, succeeding interim president Elizabeth Hitch.  Following the transition from a state college to a university in the summer of 2008, Holland became the first president of the university. Prior to joining UVU, Holland was an associate professor in the political science department at Brigham Young University (BYU) in Provo. Holland was valedictorian of BYU's political science department when he completed undergraduate work there in 1991. He studied early American political thought at Duke University in Durham, N.C. where he earned a Ph.D. in political science in 2000.  Holland also received an academic fellowship to study at Princeton University as a James Madison Fellow, and at the Hebrew University of Jerusalem as a Raoul Wallenberg Scholar. 

Building on his dissertation, Holland published Bonds of Affection: Civic Charity and the Making of America with Georgetown University Press in 2007.  

As a professional, Holland was a special assistant to former Utah Governor Mike Leavitt, and he was chief of staff for the top executive of the international consulting firm Monitor Group. As a faculty member at BYU, his emphasis on applied learning concepts led to his selection as the institution’s “Civically Engaged Scholar of the Year” by Utah Campus Compact. Previous to service at UVU, Holland was on the board of the National Organization for Marriage, which is a political organization which opposes same-sex marriage.

Holland is a member of the American Political Science Association and the American Historical Association. He also serves on boards, including the Deseret News Editorial Advisory Board, Utah Technology Council and the Salt Lake Chamber. Holland received the NESA Outstanding Eagle Scout Award through the Utah National Parks Council of BSA in 2011.

On November 6, 2017, Holland announced that he would leave his position at UVU in June 2018 to serve as a mission president for the LDS Church. He was subsequently assigned to the church's North Carolina Raleigh Mission.  In April 2018 it was announced that Astrid S. Tuminez would succeed Holland as president. On April 4, 2020 Holland was sustained as an LDS Church general authority.

Personal life
Holland's father, Jeffrey R. Holland, was president of BYU and is currently a member of the LDS Church's Quorum of the Twelve Apostles. Holland's wife, Paige, is also a Utah Valley native, graduating from Timpview High School in Provo before enrolling at BYU. The Hollands are the parents of four children.

Publications

References

External links
Office of the President
Deseret News article, March 6, 2009

1966 births
Latter Day Saints from Utah
American political scientists
Provo High School alumni
Brigham Young University alumni
Brigham Young University faculty
Duke University alumni
Living people
Princeton University fellows
Utah Valley University people
National Organization for Marriage people
Latter Day Saints from North Carolina
General authority seventies (LDS Church)
American general authorities (LDS Church)